Futbol Club Benavent was a football team from Benavent de Segrià in the autonomous community of Catalonia, Spain. Founded in 1981 and dissolved in June 2010 due to lack of support, it played its last season, 2009–10, in the Tercera División - Group 5. Its stadium was Municipal with a capacity of 1,200 seats.

History
FC Benavent was founded in 1981. On 12 June 2010, FC Benavent and JE Ascó merged into FC Ascó. The new club moves from Benavent de Segrià to Ascó. The reasons of the merger and consequent move were the little support that FC Benavent received in the town.

Season to season

1 season in Tercera División
2 seasons in Primera Catalana

Last squad

(Captain)

References

External links
Former official website

Football clubs in Catalonia
Association football clubs established in 1981
Association football clubs disestablished in 2010
Defunct football clubs in Catalonia
1981 establishments in Spain
2010 disestablishments in Spain